Maindee is a large inner-city commercial and residential area in the city of Newport, South Wales.

It lies on the eastern side of the River Usk, mostly within the electoral district (ward) of Victoria, although some areas traditionally associated with Maindee are in the Beechwood ward.

The name 'Maindee' is an anglicised version of Maendy meaning 'stone house'.

Maindee is home to a sizeable Asian-Muslim population with three mosques located in the area.

A large selection of shops are located on Chepstow Road, Corporation Road and Church Road. A station of Gwent Police and a public library are located on Chepstow Road. A station of South Wales Fire and Rescue Service is also located in Maindee.

The annual Maindee Festival and Parade, held each Summer since 1996, is a popular community arts event for all residents in Newport.

The former Maindee Pools is an Art Deco building. The disused empty swimming pool has been used for location shots in the BBC TV series Being Human.

Maindee Unlimited, a community-led regeneration charity for the Maindee area, was formed in 2014. It re-opened Llyfrgell Maindee Library for community use in October 2015. It is planning to re-open and redevelop the public toilets on Chepstow Road alongside other environmental and social projects.

External links
Maindee Unlimited
This is Newport
MaindeePools.com

Districts of Newport, Wales